The 222 Building is the tallest building in Appleton, Wisconsin. The building was built in 1952 and housed the Aid Association of Lutherans headquarters in Appleton. In 1991, a man became stuck in one of the elevators for a total of fifty-seven hours. He then sued the owners of the building, but the case was settled out of court for an undisclosed amount. In 2003, Thrivent Financial announced that the 222 Building had been sold to an undisclosed buyer.

References

Buildings and structures in Appleton, Wisconsin